Nitin Kakkar is an Indian director known for his works Mitron (2018), Jawaani Jaaneman (2020).

Filmography

References

External links

Living people

Year of birth missing (living people)
Indian film directors